David Holt (born October 15, 1946 in Gatesville, Texas) is a musician who performs traditional American music and stories. A four-time Grammy Award winner, Holt plays 10 acoustic instruments and has released recordings of traditional mountain music and southern folktales, hosted Riverwalk, a jazz program on public radio,  Folkways, a television program on folk music and culture, Great Scenic Railway Journeys, and North Carolina Mountain Treasures on North Carolina public television. 

He is the host of David Holt's State of Music, a public-TV  series distributed nationwide by PBS. The program is produced and directed by Will and Deni McIntyre and was nominated for a Midsouth Regional Emmy in 2015.

Holt performed with Doc Watson from 1998 to 2012.  He performs wearing his trademark fedora, preferring vintage examples from the 1930s and 1940s.

Holt and his wife, Ginny, have a son, Zeb, who worked for NBC in New York City. Their daughter, Sarah Jane, died in 1989 at age 10 following a car crash.

Discography

References

External links
 
 Performance by David Holt at TED, March 2004
 Culture Unplugged
 

Grammy Award winners
American folk musicians
1946 births
Living people
American storytellers
Audiobook narrators